General Sir John Houghton Gibbon,  (21 September 1917 – 1997) was a British Army officer who served as Master-General of the Ordnance from 1974 until his retirement in 1977.

Military career
Gibbon was commissioned into the Royal Artillery in 1939. He served in the Second World War with 2nd Regiment Royal Horse Artillery in France, the Western Desert, Greece, Sicily and North West Europe.

After the war, Gibbon became an instructor and subsequently chief instructor at the Royal Military Academy Sandhurst. In 1955 he was appointed Assistant Quartermaster General at the War Office and then, in 1959, he became commanding officer of 6th Field Regiment Royal Artillery within British Army of the Rhine. In 1962 he was made a brigade commander in Cyprus and then, later that year, he became Director of Defence Plans at the Ministry of Defence. He was Secretary to Chiefs of Staff Committee and Director of Defence Operations (Staff) from 1966 to 1969, when he became Director of Army Staff Duties at the Ministry of Defence. He was appointed Vice-Chief of the Defence Staff in 1972 and Master-General of the Ordnance in 1974. He retired in 1977.

Gibbon was an ADC General to the Queen.

References

|-
 

|-

1917 births
1997 deaths
British Army generals
British Army personnel of World War II
Royal Artillery officers
Knights Grand Cross of the Order of the Bath
Officers of the Order of the British Empire
Academics of the Royal Military Academy Sandhurst